Cladostephus hirsutus is a marine brown alga.

Description
This is a medium-size brown alga growing to about 20 cm length. Its fronds are covered with distinct whorls of secondary branches, giving the species a hairy appearance, the source of its specific epithet “hirsutus”.

Habitat
This alga occurs in the lower intertidal, tidepools and upper subtidal of rocky shores.

Distribution
This species has been recorded world-wide in temperate regions, e.g. from the Mediterranean Sea, the European Atlantic coasts (including the British Isles, France, Germany, Denmark, Norway, Spain, and Portugal), the Atlantic shores of the United States, the Pacific shores of Mexico, Australia, and New Zealand.

References

Brown algae
Seaweeds